The Division of Fowler is an Australian electoral division in the state of New South Wales.

Fowler is based in Sydney's outer southwestern suburbs of Liverpool, Warwick Farm, Chipping Norton, Cabramatta, Canley Vale, Mount Pritchard, Abbotsbury, Bossley Park, Edensor Park, Greenfield Park, Prairiewood, St Johns Park, Wakeley, Bonnyrigg, Canley Heights, Carramar and Fairfield East.

Fowler is a diverse electorate, containing immigrant communities of Vietnamese and Chinese ancestry. According to the 2016 census, only 40% of electors were born in Australia, while 15.2% were born in Vietnam.

The current MP is Dai Le, an Independent and the first non-Labor politician to represent Fowler. Le has strong links to the Vietnamese community in Fowler; she was born in Vietnam and migrated to Australia as an eleven year old after three years in a Philippines refugee camp.

Geography
Since 1984, federal electoral division boundaries in Australia have been determined at redistributions by a redistribution committee appointed by the Australian Electoral Commission. Redistributions occur for the boundaries of divisions in a particular state, and they occur every seven years, or sooner if a state's representation entitlement changes or when divisions of a state are malapportioned.

History

The division was created in 1984 and is named after Lilian Fowler, the first female mayor in Australia.

The division includes the Sydney suburbs of Cabramatta, Cabramatta West, Canley Heights, Chipping Norton, Edensor Park, Fairfield East, Greenfield Park, Liverpool, St Johns Park, Wakeley, and Warwick Farm; as well as parts of Abbotsbury, Bonnyrigg, Bossley Park, Canley Vale, Carramar, Fairfield, Fairfield West, Guildford, Moorebank, Mount Pritchard, Prairiewood, and Yennora.

The member for Fowler from the 2010 federal election to the 2022 federal election has been Chris Hayes, a member of the Australian Labor Party.

2022 election
After announcing that he would retire at the 2022 federal election, Hayes endorsed Tu Le, a locally resident lawyer, to succeed him. A factional dispute involving winnable seats on the Senate ticket saw Senator Kristina Keneally parachuted into the election for the "safe" seat in order to resolve the dispute. It would also allow Keneally to serve on the ministerial or shadow frontbench following the election. Keneally's move was heavily criticised both in the community and within the party for her decision to usurp the position of a local candidate, with Keneally living on Scotland Island on Sydney's Northern Beaches, over an hour's drive from the electorate.

Dai Le, a local independent who was serving as the deputy mayor of the Fairfield City Council announced her intention to stand for the seat. Dai Le had been a Liberal Party member earlier in her career until her expulsion from the party as her bid for Mayor breached party rules regarding running against an endorsed candidate.

Dai Le won the seat after a major swing against Labor. Keneally's slightly higher first preference vote was not high enough to prevent Le from winning on the two party preferred count. Liberal Party, United Australia, One Nation and Liberal Democrats preferences flowed to Le while the small amount of Green votes and voters not following a typical right to left preference flow were not enough to keep it in the hands of Labor. It was the first time Labor had lost the seat, after 13 straight election wins.

Demographic (2016 Census)

Population 
The 2016 population of the Division of Fowler was 165,164 people.

The Division of Fowler is one of Australia's most multicultural communities with a very high percentage of migrants and first generation Australians. As at the Australian 2016 Census the breakdown of country of birth was;

Highlighting Fowler's high multicultural population as compared the general Australia population. 76.1% of population of Fowler had both parents born overseas. While the general percentage of all Australians with both parents born overseas is 47%.

Median weekly income 
The median weekly personal income for people aged 15 years and over in Fowler (Commonwealth Electoral Divisions) was $452.

Employment 
There were 66,978 people who reported being in the labour force in the week before Census night in Fowler (Commonwealth Electoral Divisions). Of these 56.7% were employed full time, 27.7% were employed part-time and 10.5% were unemployed. Unemployment is significantly higher that the NSW State figure of 6.3% and the National figure of 6.9%

Members

Election results

References

External links
 Division of Fowler - Australian Electoral Commission

Electoral divisions of Australia
Constituencies established in 1984
1984 establishments in Australia